Axel Johan Lille (28 March 1848, Helsinki – 28 June 1921) was a Swedish-speaking Finnish journalist and politician and the main founder of the Swedish People's Party (Svenska folkpartiet, SFP) and its leader 1907–1917. Lille was the first who publicly proposed Finnish independence in his speech on April 9, 1902.

Lille was member of the Diet of Finland for the Estate of Burghers 1885–1900 and member of Parliament of Finland from 1916 to 1917. He founder newspaper Vikingen, refounded Nya Pressen and was its editor 1906–1914 and for its successor Dagens Press.

Lille was a Social conservative and wished to include more social reforms in SFP's program than eventually was included.

In 1902, Lille moved to Stockholm, Sweden, and he received Swedish citizenship in 1903.

References 

|-

|-

1848 births
1921 deaths
Politicians from Helsinki
People from Uusimaa Province (Grand Duchy of Finland)
Swedish-speaking Finns
Swedish People's Party of Finland politicians
Members of the Diet of Finland
Members of the Parliament of Finland (1916–17)
University of Helsinki alumni
Finnish emigrants to Sweden